Guninggame is a village in Tiom district, Lanny Jaya Regency in Highland Papua province, Indonesia. Its population is 885.

Climate
Guninggame has a cold subtropical highland climate (Cfb) with heavy rainfall year-round.

References

Villages in Highland Papua